Stroderville is an extinct town in Cape Girardeau County, in the U.S. state of Missouri. The GNIS classifies it as a populated place.

A post office called Stroderville was established in 1870, and remained in operation until 1889. The community was named after William Stroder, an early settler.

References

Ghost towns in Missouri
Former populated places in Cape Girardeau County, Missouri